Claudio Gabriel Salto (born 4 January 1995) is an Argentine football player who plays for Güemes.

Club career
He made his professional debut in the Argentine Primera División for River Plate on 15 October 2015 in a game against Defensa y Justicia.

References

1995 births
Living people
Argentine footballers
Argentine expatriate footballers
Liga Portugal 2 players
Sportspeople from Buenos Aires Province
Association football forwards
Club Atlético River Plate footballers
S.C. Freamunde players
Club Atlético Fénix players
UAI Urquiza players
Club Atlético Acassuso footballers
Club Atlético Güemes footballers
Argentine expatriate sportspeople in Portugal
Expatriate footballers in Portugal